
Gmina Ruda Maleniecka (Polish pronunciation: [ˈɾuda malɛˈɲɛt͡ska]) is a rural gmina (administrative district) in Końskie County, Świętokrzyskie Voivodeship, in south-central Poland.

Villages
Gmina Ruda Maleniecka encompasses the villages and settlements of Cieklińsko, Cis, Dęba, Dęba Kolonia, Hucisko, Koliszowy, Kołoniec, Lipa, Machory, Maleniec, Młotkowice, Ruda Maleniecka, Strzęboszów, Szkucin, Tama, Wyszyna Fałkowska, Wyszyna Machorowska and Wyszyna Rudzka.

Neighbouring gminas
Gmina Ruda Maleniecka is bordered by the gminas of Fałków, Końskie, Radoszyce, Słupia and Żarnów.

References
Polish official population figures 2006

Ruda Maleniecka
Końskie County